Millicent Mary Chaplin (1790 – 1858) was an English-born amateur artist mainly known for her watercolours depicting 19th century Canada.

Life
She was born Millicent Mary Reeve in Leadenham, Lincolnshire and came to Lower Canada with her husband Thomas Chaplin of the Coldstream Guards in 1838. Over the next four years, she painted landscapes of Ottawa, Quebec City and the Canadian Maritimes, as well as depictions of the local people. She also copied works by artists such as James Hope-Wallace, Henry William Barnard and Philip John Bainbrigge.

Chaplin died in Normanby Park, Lincolnshire in 1858.

Her work is held in the collections of the National Archives of Canada and the Royal Ontario Museum.
 
A collection of her watercolours and journals from her visit to Canada was published as Drawing on the Land: The New World Watercolours and Diaries (1838-1942) of Millicent Mary Chaplin (edited by Jim Burant) in 2004. (}}

References 

1790 births
1858 deaths
Canadian watercolourists